Polyrotaxane-based paint is a type of paint produced by Nissan. It is a coating that self heals. The Nobel prize in chemistry in 2016 was partially awarded on research on this molecule, Polyrotaxane. The paint is famous for being able to heal major scratches on iPhones, cell phones, and computers very quickly. It heals up to 80% of scratches to such devices.

Other uses
The paint has also been found to strengthen physical properties such as hardness, weatherability, stain resistance, and solvent resistance.

References

Paints